The Nokia 7390 is a mobile phone featuring the Series 40 interface from the L'Amour Collection. It was released in the United States in early 2007, elsewhere in late 2006.  It is the first 3G-capable fashion phone from Nokia. One of the useful features of the phone is the ability to play music or take pictures without opening it. The camera's maximum resolution is at 3 megapixels. The on-board music player can play MP3, AAC, eAAC+, and WMA formats and more. It is available in Bronze Black and Powder Pink.

Technical specifications
 Weight: 115 grams
 Size: 90 mm by 47 mm by 19 mm
 320x240 internal display rated at 16 million colors
 160x128 external display rated at 262 thousand colors.
 2G Network: 900/1800/1900
 3G Network: UMTS 2100
 Uses the Series 40 interface
 Talktime: 3 Hours
 Standby: Up to 200 Hours

Imaging and video
 3.15 MP camera with up to 8x zoom
 Autofocus, Flash, Self-timer
 Secondary VGA camera for videocalls
 Image formats: JPEG, Exif
 Built in Video Player
 Video Formats: 3GPP formats (H.263) and MPEG-4

Entertainment
 Integrated Music Player
 Supported music formats: AAC, AAC+, eAAC+, MP3, MP4, WMA, AMR-NB, SP-MIDI, MIDI Tones (poly 64), True tones
 FM Radio with Visual Radio
 Mobile Web Browser

Data connections
 GPRS: Class 10 (4+1/3+2 slots), 32 - 48 kbit/s
 HSCSD: Yes
 EDGE: Class 10, 236.8 kbit/s
 3G: Yes, 384 kbit/s
 Wireless LAN: No
 Bluetooth: Yes, 2.0 with A2DP
 Infrared: Port Yes
 USB: Yes, Pop-Port

References

External links
Nokia Europe 7390 Product Page
GSM Arena Product Specs
Nokia 7390 L'Amour Designer Phone Review from CoolTechZone
CNET Editor's Review for Nokia 7390

7390
Mobile phones with infrared transmitter